The 1991 Korfball World Championship was the 4th edition of the major international korfball competition. It was held in Belgium on April 2–6, in the cities of Antwerp, Berchem, Brussels, Ghent and Turnhout. In a very close final, Belgium defeated the Netherlands by 11–10, making this the only time the world championship was not won by the Netherlands.

Pool matches
Legend

* Portugal was awarded third place because it lost a match after extra-time. USA ranked above Australia on korf difference.

Final round

11th–12th places

9th–10th places

7th–8th places

5th–6th places

Bronze medal match

Final

Final standings

See also
Korfball World Championship
International Korfball Federation

External links
International Korfball Federation

References
History of the IKF and the IKF World Championship

Korfball World Championship
Korfball World Championship
IKF World Korfball Championship
International sports competitions hosted by Belgium
Korfball in Belgium